Planostocha curvosa is a species of moth of the family Tortricidae. It is found in Indonesia, where it has been recorded from the Maluku Islands.

References

	

Moths described in 1941
Archipini